Pentila rotha is a butterfly in the family Lycaenidae. It is found in Cameroon, Gabon and the Republic of the Congo.

Subspecies
Pentila rotha rotha (Gabon, Republic of the Congo)
Pentila rotha marianna Suffert, 1904 (Cameroon)

References

Butterflies described in 1873
Poritiinae
Butterflies of Africa
Taxa named by William Chapman Hewitson